"Getting Closer" is a rock song from the British rock band Wings, Paul McCartney's post-Beatles band. The song was released on the album Back to the Egg.

Background
Despite being released in 1979, McCartney was working on "Getting Closer" as early as May 1973, with its first demo recording being made then by actor Dustin Hoffman on holiday in Montego Bay, Jamaica. In 1974, McCartney made a piano demo for the song. Upon being resurrected by the band for Back to the Egg, the song, originally at a slower tempo, was transformed into a "driving rocker."

Like most of the songs off of Back to the Egg, "Getting Closer" bears an influence from punk and new wave music. Author and Mojo contributor Tom Doyle describes Wings' version as "power-popping" and reminiscent of the English band Squeeze.

Juber said of the guitars used in the song: "I think I played my Martin D28 on the rhythm track and some Les Paul Custom (the one in the video) for the electric."

Release
"Getting Closer," backed with "Spin It On," was released in the US in June 1979 as the first single from Back to the Egg. The single reached #20 on the Billboard Hot 100, as well as #20 on Cashbox and #22 on Record World. Despite not being released as the first single in the UK ("Old Siam, Sir" was used instead), the song did see a UK single release in August 1979. Marketed as a Double A-side with "Baby's Request," the single was a relative flop, only peaking at #60.

For the release of Back to the Egg, a special was made featuring music videos for multiple songs, including "Getting Closer." "Old Siam, Sir", "Spin It On" and "Arrow Through Me" were among the tracks for which videos were made.

Reception
Billboard described "Getting Closer" as "an uplifting raker in which McCartney's soaring vocals play off strong guitar, keyboards and drum lines."  Cash Box called it "a dynamic, churning pop-rocker," saying that the "slamming guitar and aggressive vocals" were reminiscent of Band on the Run.  Record World called it "another superbly crafted McCartney hook."

Charts

Weekly charts

Year-end charts

Personnel
Paul McCartney – vocals, bass, Epiphone Casino electric guitar, Mellotron
Linda McCartney – keyboards, backing vocals
Denny Laine – electric guitar, Martin D28 acoustic guitar, backing vocals
Laurence Juber – electric guitar, Ovation acoustic guitar
Steve Holley – drums

References

Paul McCartney songs
1979 singles
Paul McCartney and Wings songs
Songs written by Paul McCartney
Columbia Records singles
Parlophone singles
Song recordings produced by Paul McCartney
Song recordings produced by Chris Thomas (record producer)
Music published by MPL Music Publishing